Nanaimo is a provincial electoral district for the Legislative Assembly of British Columbia, Canada.

Demographics

Geography 
The riding contains most of the city of Nanaimo plus the uninhabited Five Finger Island, Snake Island and Hudson Rocks which are in the Nanaimo C electoral area.

History 

The district was known as Nanaimo and the Islands from 1941 to 1963. It was formed of parts of the former ridings of Alberni-Nanaimo and The Islands. In the 1966 election the Nanaimo riding name was restored and the southern part of the riding became Saanich and the Islands. That area is now part of Saanich North and the Islands. An older riding with the name Nanaimo existed from 1871 to 1928.

In 1966, the riding contained the eastern and southern portions of the Nanaimo Regional District, plus Valdes Island and Lasqueti Island.

For the 1979 election, the riding shifted southwards, running from Lantzville in the north to Ladysmith in the south. It also lost Valdes and Lasqueti Islands.

From 1986 to 1991, the riding returned two members. In 1991, the riding shrunk in size. The northern part of the riding, including the northern coast of the City of Nanaimo was transferred to Parksville-Qualicum, while the southern boundary was moved up to the southern limit of the Nanaimo Regional District, except for Valdes Island, which was added back to the riding.

In 2001, the riding's western boundaries were extended to include nearly all of the Nanaimo C Electoral Area.

In 2009, the riding was drastically reduced in size, consisting solely of part of the city of Nanaimo. In the 2017 redistribution, the riding gained part of the City of Nanaimo west of the Nanaimo Parkway.

Member of Legislative Assembly

Election results 

^ Change is based on redistributed results

 
|New Democratic
|Dale Lovick
|align="right"|11,210
|align="right"|48.75
|align="right"|
|align="right"|$16,425

|-

 

|-
 
|NDP
|Dale Lovick
|align="right"|11,135
|align="right"|51.25%
|align="right"|
|align="right"|$39,246
|-

|- bgcolor="white"
!align="right" colspan=3|Total Valid Votes
!align="right"|21,729
!align="right"|100.00%
!align="right"|
!align="right"|
|- bgcolor="white"
!align="right" colspan=3|Total Rejected Ballots
!align="right"|469
!align="right"|2.11%
!align="right"|
!align="right"|
|- bgcolor="white"
!align="right" colspan=3|Turnout
!align="right"|22,198
!align="right"|74.54%
!align="right"|
!align="right"|
|}

|-
 
|NDP
|Jan Pullinger
|align="right"|14,613
|align="right"|57.12%
|align="right"|
|align="right"|$36,999
|-

|- bgcolor="white"
!align="right" colspan=3|Total Valid Votes
!align="right"|25,583
!align="right"|100.00%
!align="right"|
!align="right"|
|- bgcolor="white"
!align="right" colspan=3|Total Rejected Ballots
!align="right"|183
!align="right"|0.71%
!align="right"|
!align="right"|
|- bgcolor="white"
!align="right" colspan=3|Turnout
!align="right"|25,766
!align="right"|54.29%
!align="right"|
!align="right"|
|}

|-
 
|NDP
|David Stupich
|align="right"|18,213
|align="right"|26.52%
|align="right"|
|align="right"|
 
|NDP
|Dale Lovick
|align="right"|17,251
|align="right"|25.11%
|align="right"|
|align="right"|

|- bgcolor="white"
!align="right" colspan=3|Total Valid Votes
!align="right"|68,689
!align="right"|100.00%
!align="right"|
!align="right"|
|- bgcolor="white"
!align="right" colspan=3|Total Rejected Ballots
!align="right"|773
!align="right"|%
!align="right"|
!align="right"|
|- bgcolor="white"
!align="right" colspan=3|Turnout
!align="right"|
!align="right"|%
!align="right"|
!align="right"|
|- bgcolor="white"
!align="right" colspan=7|1 two-member seat during this election
|}

|-
 
|NDP
|David Stupich
|align="right"|17,436
|align="right"|52.17%
|align="right"|
|align="right"|

|Liberal
|Shelagh J.F. (Sue) Matthews
|align="right"|554 	
|align="right"|1.66%
|align="right"|
|align="right"|

|Independent
|Howard Peter Yearwood
|align="right"|228 	
|align="right"|0.68%
|align="right"|
|align="right"|
|- bgcolor="white"
!align="right" colspan=3|Total Valid Votes
!align="right"|33,423 
!align="right"|100.00%
!align="right"|
!align="right"|
|- bgcolor="white"
!align="right" colspan=3|Total Rejected Ballots
!align="right"|269
!align="right"|%
!align="right"|
!align="right"|
|- bgcolor="white"
!align="right" colspan=3|Turnout
!align="right"|
!align="right"|%
!align="right"|
!align="right"|
|- bgcolor="white"
!align="right" colspan=7|
|}

|-
 
|NDP
|David Stupich
|align="right"|17,021
|align="right"|58.69%
|align="right"|
|align="right"|

|- bgcolor="white"
!align="right" colspan=3|Total Valid Votes
!align="right"|29,000
!align="right"|100.00%
!align="right"|
!align="right"|
|- bgcolor="white"
!align="right" colspan=3|Total Rejected Ballots
!align="right"|420
!align="right"|%
!align="right"|
!align="right"|
|- bgcolor="white"
!align="right" colspan=3|Turnout
!align="right"|
!align="right"|%
!align="right"|
!align="right"|
|}  	  	  	

|-
 
|NDP
|David Stupich
|align="right"|12,177
|align="right"|49.08%
|align="right"|
|align="right"|

|Progressive Conservative
|Marjorie Ennis Moore
|align="right"|869 		
|align="right"|3.50%
|align="right"|
|align="right"|

|Liberal
|William Harold Matthews
|align="right"|636 	
|align="right"|2.56%
|align="right"|
|align="right"|

|- bgcolor="white"
!align="right" colspan=3|Total Valid Votes
!align="right"|24,813 
!align="right"|100.00%
!align="right"|
!align="right"|
|- bgcolor="white"
!align="right" colspan=3|Total Rejected Ballots
!align="right"|187
!align="right"|%
!align="right"|
!align="right"|
|- bgcolor="white"
!align="right" colspan=3|Turnout
!align="right"|
!align="right"|%
!align="right"|
!align="right"|
|}

|-
 
|NDP
|David Stupich
|align="right"|10,478
|align="right"|52.60%
|align="right"|
|align="right"|

|Progressive Conservative
|Graeme C. Roberts
|align="right"|1,880 	 		
|align="right"|9.44%
|align="right"|
|align="right"|

|Liberal
|Lloyd Schoop
|align="right"|916 	 	
|align="right"|4.60%
|align="right"|
|align="right"|

|Independent
|Nelson Edward Allen
|align="right"|238 	
|align="right"|1.19%
|align="right"|
|align="right"|
|- bgcolor="white"
!align="right" colspan=3|Total Valid Votes
!align="right"|19,921
!align="right"|100.00%
!align="right"|
!align="right"|
|- bgcolor="white"
!align="right" colspan=3|Total Rejected Ballots
!align="right"|327
!align="right"|%
!align="right"|
!align="right"|
|- bgcolor="white"
!align="right" colspan=3|Turnout
!align="right"|
!align="right"|%
!align="right"|
!align="right"|
|}

|-

 
|NDP
|David Stupich
|align="right"|7,790 			 		
|align="right"|46.47%
|align="right"|
|align="right"|

|Liberal
|Robert Steven Plecas
|align="right"|722 	 	 	
|align="right"|4.31%
|align="right"|
|align="right"|
|- bgcolor="white"
!align="right" colspan=3|Total Valid Votes
!align="right"|16,764 	
!align="right"|100.00%
!align="right"|
!align="right"|
|- bgcolor="white"
!align="right" colspan=3|Total Rejected Ballots
!align="right"|153
!align="right"|%
!align="right"|
!align="right"|
|- bgcolor="white"
!align="right" colspan=3|Turnout
!align="right"|
!align="right"|%
!align="right"|
!align="right"|
|}

|-
 
|NDP
|David Stupich
|align="right"|5,625
|align="right"|47.99%
|align="right"|
|align="right"|

|Liberal
|Robert Paul Goseltine
|align="right"|516 	 	 	 	
|align="right"|4.40%
|align="right"|
|align="right"|
|- bgcolor="white"
!align="right" colspan=3|Total Valid Votes
!align="right"|11,721 
!align="right"|100.00%
!align="right"|
!align="right"|
|- bgcolor="white"
!align="right" colspan=3|Total Rejected Ballots
!align="right"|114
!align="right"|%
!align="right"|
!align="right"|
|- bgcolor="white"
!align="right" colspan=3|Turnout
!align="right"|
!align="right"|%
!align="right"|
!align="right"|
|}

Nanaimo and The Islands (1941-1966)

|-

|NDP
|David Stupich
|align="right"|4,278
|align="right"|42.44%
|align="right"|
|align="right"|unknown

|Liberal
|Robert Clayton Weir
|align="right"|960 	
|align="right"|9.52%
|align="right"|
|align="right"|unknown

|Progressive Conservative
|Cornelia Petronella Adriana Wildman
|align="right"|582 	
|align="right"|5.77%
|align="right"|
|align="right"|unknown
|- bgcolor="white"
!align="right" colspan=3|Total valid votes
!align="right"|10,079
!align="right"|100.00%
!align="right"|
|- bgcolor="white"
!align="right" colspan=3|Total rejected ballots
!align="right"|79
!align="right"|
!align="right"|
|- bgcolor="white"
!align="right" colspan=3|Turnout
!align="right"|65.33%
!align="right"|
!align="right"|
|}

|-

|Co-operative Commonwealth Fed.
|Colin Cameron
|align="right"|4,548 	
|align="right"|41.87%
|align="right"|
|align="right"|unknown

|Liberal
|Hugh Basil Heath
|align="right"|1,036
|align="right"|9.54%
|align="right"|
|align="right"|unknown

|Progressive Conservative
|Edward Drewry Strongitharm
|align="right"|607 	
|align="right"|5.59%
|align="right"|
|align="right"|unknown

|- bgcolor="white"
!align="right" colspan=3|Total valid votes
!align="right"|10,862
!align="right"|100.00%
!align="right"|
|- bgcolor="white"
!align="right" colspan=3|Total rejected ballots
!align="right"|151
!align="right"|
!align="right"|
|- bgcolor="white"
!align="right" colspan=3|Turnout
!align="right"|%
!align="right"|
!align="right"|
|}

|-

|Independent
|Edward Joseph Brewster
|align="right"|69
|align="right"|0.77%
|align="right"|
|align="right"|unknown

|Co-operative Commonwealth Fed.
|Arthur Roderick Glen
|align="right"|2,963 	
|align="right"|32.92%
|align="right"|
|align="right"|unknown

|Liberal
|Peter Maffeo
|align="right"|2,142 	
|align="right"|23.80%
|align="right"|
|align="right"|unknown

|- bgcolor="white"
!align="right" colspan=3|Total valid votes
!align="right"|9,001 	
!align="right"|100.00%
!align="right"|
|- bgcolor="white"
!align="right" colspan=3|Total rejected ballots
!align="right"|109
!align="right"|
!align="right"|
|- bgcolor="white"
!align="right" colspan=3|Turnout
!align="right"|%
!align="right"|
!align="right"|
|}

|-

|Liberal
|Elmer Pearce Bradshaw
|align="right"|1,375 	
|align="right"|13.99%
|align="right"| -
|align="right"| - %
|align="right"|
|align="right"|unknown

|Independent
|Edward Joseph Brewster
|align="right"|32 	
|align="right"|0.33%
|align="right"| -
|align="right"| - %
|align="right"|
|align="right"|unknown

|Progressive Conservative
|Larry Giovando
|align="right"|2,046
|align="right"|20.82%
|align="right"|4,376
|align="right"|50.10%
|align="right"|
|align="right"|unknown

|Co-operative Commonwealth Fed.
|David Stupich
|align="right"|3,631 	 	 	
|align="right"|36.96%
|align="right"|4,358
|align="right"|49.90%
|align="right"|
|align="right"|unknown

|Labor-Progressive
|Grace Ellen Tickson
|align="right"|115 	
|align="right"|1.17%
|align="right"|-
|align="right"|-%
|align="right"|
|align="right"|unknown

|- bgcolor="white"
!align="right" colspan=3|Total valid votes
!align="right"|9,825 	 	 	
!align="right"|100.00%
!align="right"|8,734
!align="right"|%
!align="right"|
|- bgcolor="white"
!align="right" colspan=3|Total rejected ballots
!align="right"|363
!align="right"|
!align="right"|
!align="right"|
!align="right"|
|- bgcolor="white"
!align="right" colspan=3|Total Registered Voters
!align="right"|
!align="right"|
!align="right"|
!align="right"|
!align="right"|
|- bgcolor="white"
!align="right" colspan=3|Turnout
!align="right"|%
!align="right"|
!align="right"|
!align="right"|
!align="right"|
|- bgcolor="white"
!align="right" colspan=9|Preferential ballot; final count is between top two candidates from first count; intermediary counts (of 5) not shown
|}

|-

|Liberal
|Elmer Pearce Bradshaw
|align="right"|2,263
|align="right"|21.59%
|align="right"| -
|align="right"| - %
|align="right"|
|align="right"|unknown

|Progressive Conservative
|Larry Giovando
|align="right"|3,346
|align="right"|31.92%
|align="right"|5,144
|align="right"|52.89%
|align="right"|
|align="right"|unknown

|Labor-Progressive
|Nigel Morgan
|align="right"|207
|align="right"|1.97%
|align="right"|-
|align="right"|-%
|align="right"|
|align="right"|unknown

|Co-operative Commonwealth Fed.
|David Stupich
|align="right"|3,715
|align="right"|35.44%
|align="right"|4,581
|align="right"|47.11%
|align="right"|
|align="right"|unknown
|- bgcolor="white"
!align="right" colspan=3|Total valid votes
!align="right"|10,482
!align="right"|100.00%
!align="right"|9,725
!align="right"|%
!align="right"|
|- bgcolor="white"
!align="right" colspan=3|Total rejected ballots
!align="right"|207
!align="right"|
!align="right"|
|- bgcolor="white"
!align="right" colspan=3|Turnout
!align="right"|%
!align="right"|
!align="right"|
|- bgcolor="white"
!align="right" colspan=9|1 Preferential ballot; final count is between top two candidates from first count; intermediary counts (of 4) not shown
|}

|-

|Co-operative Commonwealth Fed.
|David Stupich
|align="right"|3,564 		
|align="right"|37.41%
|align="right"|
|align="right"|unknown

|- bgcolor="white"
!align="right" colspan=3|Total valid votes
!align="right"|9,528
!align="right"|100.00%
!align="right"|
|- bgcolor="white"
!align="right" colspan=3|Total rejected ballots
!align="right"|58
!align="right"|
!align="right"|
|- bgcolor="white"
!align="right" colspan=3|Turnout
!align="right"|%
!align="right"|
!align="right"|
|}

|-

|Co-operative Commonwealth Fed.
|Joseph White
|align="right"|2,547 	
|align="right"|44.22%
|align="right"|
|align="right"|unknown
|- bgcolor="white"
!align="right" colspan=3|Total valid votes
!align="right"|5,760
!align="right"|100.00%
!align="right"|
|- bgcolor="white"
!align="right" colspan=3|Total rejected ballots
!align="right"|66
!align="right"|
!align="right"|
|- bgcolor="white"
!align="right" colspan=3|Turnout
!align="right"|63.19%
!align="right"|
!align="right"|
|}

|-

|Co-operative Commonwealth Fed.
|Thomas O'Connor
|align="right"|1,615 	
|align="right"|32.31%
|align="right"|
|align="right"|unknown

|Liberal
|George Sharratt Pearson
|align="right"|2,175
|align="right"|43.52%
|align="right"|
|align="right"|unknown
|- bgcolor="white"
!align="right" colspan=3|Total valid votes
!align="right"|4,998
!align="right"|100.00%
!align="right"|
|- bgcolor="white"
!align="right" colspan=3|Total rejected ballots
!align="right"|62
!align="right"|
!align="right"|
|- bgcolor="white"
!align="right" colspan=3|Turnout
!align="right"|%
!align="right"|
!align="right"|
|}

External links 
BC Stats Profile - 2001
Results of 2001 election (pdf)
2001 Expenditures
Results of 1996 election
1996 Expenditures
Results of 1991 election
1991 Expenditures
Results of 1989 by-election
1989 Expenditures
Website of the Legislative Assembly of British Columbia

References

British Columbia provincial electoral districts on Vancouver Island
Politics of Nanaimo